Prionoxystus robiniae, the carpenterworm moth or locust borer, is a moth of the family Cossidae. It was first described by Peck in 1818 and it is found in southern Canada and most of the United States.

The wingspan is 43–85 mm. Adults are on wing from May to July depending on the location.

The larvae feed on locust, oak, chestnut, poplar, willow, maple and ash. The species is considered a pest, because the tunnels the larvae create decrease the value of hardwood lumber.

References

External links

Cossinae